Liang Yimin (born August 1964) is a former Chinese politician from south China's Guangdong province. From February 2013 to October 2014 he served as Communist Party Secretary of Maoming. He was indicted on corruption charges in March 2015.

Early life and education
Liang was born and raised in Kaiping, Guangdong. In  February 1984, he attended Foshan Fiscal School. He graduated from Guangdong Central Party School of the Chinese Communist Party, earning a MBA degree.

Career
He began working in October 1982 and joined the Chinese Communist Party in September 1987.

Beginning in 1982, he served in several posts in Kaiping Revenue and Tax Bureau, including director and party group secretary. From May 2000 to May 2003, he served as director and CPC Party Chief of Foshan Revenuetax Bureau.

In May 2003, he was appointed the Vice-Mayor of Foshan, a position he held until January 2007, he also served as CPC Party Chief of Chancheng District from May 2006 to July 2010.

He became CPC Party Chief of Shunde District in July 2010, he remained in that position until February 2011, when he was transferred to Maoming and appointed the Deputy CPC Party Chief and Mayor.

In February 2013 he was promoted to become the CPC Party Chief of Maoming, replacing Deng Haiguang.

Downfall
On October 14, 2014, he was being investigated by the Central Commission for Discipline Inspection for "serious violations of laws and regulations". He was indicted on criminal bribery charges in March 2015.

On December 5, 2016, he was expelled from the Chinese Communist Party and removed from public office.

References

1964 births
People's Republic of China politicians from Guangdong
Living people
Political office-holders in Guangdong
Chinese Communist Party politicians from Guangdong
People from Kaiping
Politicians from Jiangmen